Raheem Jamaal Appleby (born May 16, 1993) is an American basketball player for USK Praha of the NBL.

High school career
Appleby played high school basketball at Jacksonville, where he was coached by Victory Joyner, Terry Wilson and Roy Jackson. He was named all-conference and to all-state team two years. As a senior, he averaged 26 points, 3 assist and 3 rebounds per game.

College career
As a freshman, Appleby played 32 games and won the Freshman of the Year award at Western Athletic Conference after producing 13.9 points and 2.4 rebounds per game. As a sophomore Appleby played in 34 contests, and improved his numbers, averaging 14.9 points, 2.7 rebounds and 1.2 assists per game. During the next two years, his number were also impressing and as a senior, he went on to average 14.9 points, 2.7 rebounds and 2 assists per game.

Professional career
After going undrafted in the 2015 NBA draft, Appleby joined PVSK Panthers of the Hungarian League but left the team after one month. On October, he left the team and moved to Apollon Limassol of the Cypriot League.

On June 6, 2016, he joined Kouvot of the Finish League
.

On July 17, 2017, Appleby joined Aries Trikala of the Greek Basket League, but he left the team without appearing in a single game.

References

External links
Eurobasket.com Profile
RealGM.com Profile

1993 births
Living people
American expatriate basketball people in Cyprus
American expatriate basketball people in Finland
Apollon Limassol BC players
Basketball players from Arkansas
Louisiana Tech Bulldogs basketball players
Point guards
Shooting guards
American men's basketball players